Haploptychius is a genus of air-breathing land snails, terrestrial pulmonate gastropod mollusks in the family Streptaxidae.

Distribution
The distribution of the genus Haploptychius includes:
 Andaman Islands and south India
 South-East Asia
 southern and central China
 North Sulawesi

Species
Species within the genus Haploptychius include:
 Haploptychius anceyi (Mabille, 1887)
 Haploptychius andamanicus (Benson, 1860)
 Haploptychius anhduongae Thach, 2017
 Haploptychius bachmaensis Bui & Do D.S., 2019 
 Haploptychius blaisei (Dautzenberg & Fischer, 1905)
 Haploptychius bourguignati (Mabille, 1887)
 Haploptychius burmanicus (Blanford, 1864)
 Haploptychius celebicus (P. Sarasin & F. Sarasin, 1899)
 Haploptychius costulatus (Möllendorff, 1881)
 Haploptychius deflexus (Souleyet, 1852)
 Haploptychius diespiter (Mabille, 1887)
 Haploptychius dorri (Dautzenberg, 1893)
 Haploptychius fagoti (Mabille, 1887)
 Haploptychius fischeri (Morlet, 1887)
 Haploptychius juedelli Yen, 1939
 Haploptychius juttingae van Bruggen, 1972
 Haploptychius nautilus (P. Sarasin & F. Sarasin, 1899)
 Haploptychius occidentalis (Heude, 1885)
 Haploptychius pachychilus (Möllendorff, 1884)
 Haploptychius pellucens (Pfeiffer, 1863)
 Haploptychius perlissus Vermeulen, Luu, Theary & Anker, 2019
 Haploptychius pfeifferi (Zelebor, 1867)
 Haploptychius porrectus (Pfeiffer, 1863)
 Haploptychius sinensis (Gould, 1859)
 Haploptychius sinuosa (L. Pfeiffer, 1861)

References

 Mabille, J., 1887 Molluscorum tonkinorum diagnoses. Masson A., Meulan, p. 18 pp 
 Dautzenberg, P. & Fischer, H., 1905. Liste des Mollusques récoltés par M. le Capitaine de Frégate Blaise au Tonkin et description d'espèces nouvelles. Journal de Conchyliologie 53: 85-234
Annotated checklist of the terrestrial molluscs from Laos (Mollusca, Gastropoda). ZooKeys 834: 1-166

External links
 Kobelt, W. (1905-1906). Die Raublungenschnecken (Agnatha). Abtheilung 2, Streptaxidae und Daudebardiidae. In: Systematisches Conchylien-Cabinet von Martini & Chemnitz, ed. 2. Bd. 1, Abt. 12B, Theil 2: 211 pp. Nürnberg, Bauer & Raspe.[pp. 1-96, pls 42-59 (1905); 97-211, pls 60-71 (1906)
 Inkhavilay K., Siriboon T., Sutcharit C., Rowson B. & Panha S. (2016). The first revision of the carnivorous land snail family Streptaxidae in Laos, with description of three new species (Pulmonata, Stylommatophora, Streptaxidae). ZooKeys. 589: 23-53

Streptaxidae